The Littlefield River is a  tributary of the Middle Branch Mousam River in York County, Maine. Via the Middle Branch and the Mousam River, its waters flow to the Atlantic Ocean.

The river is entirely within the town of Alfred, rising at the outlet of Shaker Pond north of the town center and flowing south to the Middle Branch of the Mousam River, south of the town center.

See also
List of rivers of Maine

References

Maine Streamflow Data from the USGS
Maine Watershed Data From Environmental Protection Agency

Rivers of York County, Maine
Alfred, Maine
Rivers of Maine